Withcall is a small farming village  and civil parish in the East Lindsey district of Lincolnshire, England.

The village was served by Withcall railway station, a small station halt on the long-since defunct Louth to Bardney line; a section of the platform edge remains, and there is a well-preserved tunnel close by. The first passenger train passed through the tunnel in 1876 and the last train in 1956.

References

External links

Villages in Lincolnshire
Civil parishes in Lincolnshire
East Lindsey District